Rajesh Ganapathy is a physicist at the International Centre for Materials Science in Jawaharlal Nehru Centre for Advanced Scientific Research (JNCASR), Bengaluru. He specialises in experimental soft condensed matter physics. He was awarded the Shanti Swarup Bhatnagar Prize for Science and Technology for his contributions to physical sciences in 2020.

Rajesh Ganapathy secured his M Sc degree from Indian Institute of Technology Madras in 1999 and Ph D degree from Indian Institute of Science, Bangalore in 2006. He was a post doctoral fellow in Cornell University during 2007 - 09 and he joined JNCASR in 2009.

Publications

References

Living people
Indian physicists
21st-century Indian physicists
Recipients of the Shanti Swarup Bhatnagar Award in Physical Science
Year of birth missing (living people)